The following is a list of songs that have charted for 50 weeks or more in total on the UK Singles Chart, according to the Official Charts Company (OCC). The chart here is as recorded by the OCC, i.e. usually a Top 50 from 1960 to 1978, Top 75 from then until 1982, and Top 100 from 1983 onwards. In the pre-digital age, records with re-recorded vocals (for example, live versions) and Remixes released with substantially different catalogue numbers did not count towards the total and were seen as new hits (see "Blue Monday" as an example). In the digital age, if versions of a record are substantially the same tune, whether the release is remixed, live or re-recorded, they are combined under one chart entry, unless the record company has requested a version to be listed as a separate entry.

With a total of 313 weeks, the song with the most weeks in the Top 100 is "Mr Brightside" by the Killers. Mariah Carey is the artist to spend the most weeks into the Top 10 and Top 40. When only a Top 50 was compiled, Frank Sinatra's "My Way" set a record which still stands: 122 weeks in the Top 50 between April 1969 and January 1972. It also held the record for most weeks in the top 40 with 75, until The Pogues' "Fairytale of New York" achieved its 76th week in the region in 2021 and most weeks in the top 75 with 124, which was surpassed by Ed Sheeran's "Perfect" in 2021.

The longest unbroken run in the Top 100 is 105 weeks for “Blinding Lights” by The Weeknd, which also holds the longest consecutive run in the top 75 (103 weeks). Engelbert Humperdinck's "Release Me" held the record run in the Top 50, at 56 weeks, for over 40 years until beaten by "All of Me" by John Legend with 58 consecutive weeks in the top 50 (since passed by "Thinking Out Loud" with 63 weeks). The song with the most weeks at No. 1 and in the Top 10 is "I Believe" by Frankie Laine which stayed in the Top 10 for 35 weeks, 18 of them at No. 1 and a further seven at No. 2. Also noteworthy is "Rock Around the Clock" by Bill Haley & His Comets, the only song released in the 1950s to appear in the lists, which achieved 36 of its weeks when only a Top 20 or Top 30 were published.

In the pre-digital era, Christmas-themed songs were often re-released in different years and several have continued to chart each year from the mid-noughties onwards. "Merry Xmas Everybody" by Slade has had 25 chart runs in 28 different years (1973–74, 1980–87, 1989–90 and 2006–21), while "Fairytale of New York" by the Pogues and Kirsty MacColl has reached the Top 10 eight times and spent a record 61 weeks in the Top 20 and 76 weeks in the Top 40. In a similar but more modest way, since 2007, "Thriller" by Michael Jackson and "Ghostbusters" by Ray Parker Jr. have charted at Halloween in thirteen and eleven years, respectively.

The numbers shown are up to the chart for week ending 18 November 2021.

Songs with 20 or more weeks in the Top 10
27 songs have spent 20 or more weeks in the Top 10 of the UK Charts. "All I Want for Christmas Is You" by Mariah Carey holds the record for the most weeks in the Top 10 history with 39 weeks."Last Christmas" by Wham! holds the record for the most weeks in the top 10 by a British act with 36 weeks and second for the most weeks in the Top 10 history, behind only Mariah Carey.  However, "I Believe" by Frankie Laine holds for the most consecutive weeks in the top 10 with 35 weeks. "Fairytale of New York" by The Pogues featuring Kirsty MacColl holds the record for the most weeks in the Top 10 without reaching number one with 28 weeks.

Songs with 50 or more weeks in the Top 40
The Top 40 chart has been broadcast weekly on BBC Radio 1 (currently as The Official Chart) since the 1980s and is often referred to as 'the charts'. Appearing in the Top 40 can greatly increase a song's exposure on television and radio. "All I Want for Christmas Is You" by Mariah Carey holds the record for the most weeks in the Top 40 history with 85 weeks. In June 2015, "Thinking Out Loud" by Ed Sheeran became the first (and so far only) single to stay in the Top 40 for 52 consecutive weeks - equivalent to one year, having spent a record-breaking 18 weeks in the chart before reaching No. 1.

 includes 5-day 'week' ending 9 July 2015, when the chart week changed from Sunday-Saturday to Friday-Thursday.

Songs with 50 or more weeks in the Top 75
The Top 75 was published each week by Music Week magazine until March 2021 (when it became a monthly publication), with records reaching the top 75 described as hits (as in the case of The Virgin/Guinness Book of British Hit Singles). Since March 2021, the Official Charts Company have compiled a monthly Top 75 chart countdown for the publication. In regards to the weekly chart, the longest continuous run in the Top 75 is 103 weeks for "Blinding Lights" by The Weeknd (December 2019 to November 2021). In 2014, "Happy" by Pharrell Williams and "Let It Go" by Idina Menzel became the first singles ever to stay in the Top 75 for a whole calendar year, since also achieved by "Blinding Lights" by The Weeknd in 2020. Frank Sinatra's "My Way" held the record for most weeks in the top 75 for nearly 50 years until it was broken by "Perfect" in 2021.

 some or all weeks in charts when only the Top 50 is compiled.

 some weeks in charts when only Top 30 or less is compiled.

 includes five-day 'week' ending 9 July 2015 when the chart week changed from Sunday-Saturday to Friday-Thursday.

Songs with 100 or more weeks in the Top 100
The Top 100 is published each week by the Official Charts Company. Mariah Carey has the female song to spend the most weeks into the chart history with "All I Want For Christmas Is You". The longest continuous run in the Top 100 is 105 weeks for “Blinding Lights” by The Weeknd. Ed Sheeran has the most songs with over 50 weeks in the Top 100 with nine.

On 4 February 2022, "Mr Brightside" became the first song to hit 300 weeks in the top 100.

 Some or all weeks in charts when only top 50 compiled.

 Some weeks in charts when only top 30 or less compiled.

 Includes five-day 'week' ending Thursday 9 July 2015 when the chart week changed from Sunday-Saturday to Friday-Thursday.

Notable singles

"Blue Monday"
New Order's "Blue Monday" includes the remixed version of the original, which was finally made available as a single for the first time in 1988 with almost the same catalogue number; sales for this shorter version and the original were combined, when calculating its chart position. The second remix, from 1995, charted for four weeks but is excluded from this list.

"Merry Xmas Everybody"
In addition to Slade's total of 105 weeks in the Top 100 for "Merry Xmas Everybody", they also had two remixes of the song, not counted because they were re-recorded with other artists. The first, from 1980, was credited to Slade and the Reading Choir; the second, from 1998, was credited to Slade vs. Flush, which peaked at #30 and accumulated four weeks in the top 100.

"I Wish It Could Be Christmas Everyday"
The original version credited to Wizzard 'featuring vocal backing by The Suedettes plus The Stockland Green Bilateral School First Year Choir with additional noises by Miss Snob and Class 3C' spent nine weeks in the charts in 1973-74. When the record was going to be re-released in the 1980s, it was found that the master tapes had been lost and so Roy Wood re-recorded a solo sound-a-like version with children from Kempsey Primary School in 1981 and this was released on Harvest Records, credited to Wizzard with the same catalogue number.

This 1981 version was also re-issued in 1984 when it reached number 23 in the charts. However, the week before Wizzard charted at number 50 on the Top 75 of 09 - 15 December 1984, "I Wish It Could Be Christmas Everyday" appeared as a new entry at number 86 credited to Roy Wood and Wizzard. It was this record which re-charted with another week in 1985 and in 1986, giving "I Wish It Could Be Christmas Everyday" 11 weeks on the chart overall during the 1980s. In the digital age of streaming and downloads (from 2007 to 2021), the 1981 version has spent 64 weeks in the charts credited simply to Wizzard with the label rights being credited to EMI, making a total of 85 weeks in the Top 100 for the record overall.

In 1995, Wood recorded a live version and released it as a single on his own independent record label Woody Recordings. Credited to Roy Wood Big Band, this live track charted at Number 59 in the UK Singles Chart and stayed in the Top 100 for 2 weeks. Then in 2000, Wood re-recorded the song as part of a medley with The Wombles's song "Wombling Merry Christmas". This medley was released as "I Wish It Could Be a Wombling Christmas Everyday" and reached number 22 in the UK Singles Chart.

"White Lines"
Grandmaster Melle Mel's "White Lines (Don't Don't Do It)" was remixed in 1994 and charted for an additional three weeks, making 46 in total in the top 75 (61 in the top 100 including one in 2004). It was also re-recorded in 1995 by Duran Duran featuring Melle Mel and Grandmaster Flash and the Furious Five and charted for another five weeks (not counted towards its total).

"Three Lions"
"Three Lions", recorded by Baddiel and Skinner and The Lightning Seeds, is not eligible for the above list for either version but has clocked up an impressive 57 weeks on the UK Singles Chart Top 75 under the guise of "Three Lions" and "3 Lions '98" and 67 weeks in the Top 100. It was originally released in 1996 as "Three Lions", then subsequently re-recorded with different lyrics in 1998 as "3 Lions '98", a version which was re-issued in 2002. Then in 2006, both recordings were re-issued on a Sony DualDisc as "Three Lions/Three Lions '98", with "Three Lions" charting again in 2010 due to downloads. In 2018, "Three Lions" reached No. 1 in the UK Chart for one week, due to England's success at the World Cup, with the 1998 version being combined under the original's sales total, and re-charted in 2021 due to the UEFA Euro 2020 Championship taking place. Skinner, Baddiel and Broudie were also part of a version released in 2010 by The Squad, aptly called "Three Lions 2010"; this version tallied up a further six weeks in addition to the 67 weeks, but is seen as a separate recording act by the Official Charts Company.

See also 

 List of albums which have spent the most weeks on the UK Albums Chart
 List of artists who have spent the most weeks on the UK music charts

Notes

References

External links 
 Music charts at officialcharts.com

United Kingdom
British record charts
Lists of record chart achievements